A dimer (di-, "two" + -mer, "parts") is an oligomer consisting of two monomers joined by bonds that can be either strong or weak, covalent or intermolecular. Dimers also have significant implications in polymer chemistry; inorganic chemistry, and biochemistry. 

The term homodimer is used when the two molecules are identical (e.g. A–A) and heterodimer when they are not (e.g. A–B). The reverse of dimerization is often called dissociation. When two oppositely charged ions associate into dimers, they are referred to as Bjerrum pairs, after Niels Bjerrum.

Noncovalent dimers 

Anhydrous carboxylic acids form dimers by hydrogen bonding of the acidic hydrogen and the carbonyl oxygen. For example, acetic acid forms a dimer in the gas phase, where the monomer units are held together by hydrogen bonds. Under special conditions, most OH-containing molecules form dimers, e.g. the water dimer.

Excimers and exciplexes are excited structures with a short lifetime. For example, noble gases do not form stable dimers, but they do form the excimers Ar2*, Kr2* and Xe2* under high pressure and electrical stimulation.

Covalent dimers 

Molecular dimers are often formed by the reaction of two identical compounds e.g.: . In this example, monomer "A" is said to dimerize to give the dimer "". An example is a diaminocarbene, which dimerize to give a tetraaminoethylene:
2 C(NR2)2  ->  (R2N)2C=C(NR2)2
Carbenes are highly reactive and readily form bonds.

Dicyclopentadiene is an asymmetrical dimer of two cyclopentadiene molecules that have reacted in a Diels-Alder reaction to give the product. Upon heating, it "cracks" (undergoes a retro-Diels-Alder reaction) to give identical monomers:
C10H12 ->  2  C5H6

Many nonmetallic elements occur as dimers: hydrogen, nitrogen, oxygen, and the halogens (i.e. fluorine, chlorine, bromine and iodine). Noble gases can form dimers linked by van der Waals bonds, such as dihelium or diargon. Mercury occurs as a mercury(I) cation, formally a dimeric ion. Other metals may form a proportion of dimers in their vapour phase. Known metallic dimers include dilithium, disodium, dipotassium, dirubidium and dicaesium. Such elemental dimers are homonuclear diatomic molecules. 

Many small organic molecules, most notably formaldehyde, easily form dimers. The dimer of formaldehyde is dioxetane.

Borane occurs as the dimer diborane, due to the high Lewis acidity of the boron center.

Polymer chemistry
In the context of polymers, "dimer" also refers to the degree of polymerization 2, regardless of the stoichiometry or condensation reactions. 

One case where this is applicable is with disaccharides. For example, cellobiose is a dimer of glucose, even though the formation reaction produces water:
 2 C6H12O6 -> C12H22O11 + H2O
Here, the resulting dimer has a stoichiometry different from the initial pair of monomers.

Disaccharides need not be composed of the same monosaccharides to be considered dimers. An example is sucrose, a dimer of fructose and glucose, which follows the same reaction equation as presented above. 

Amino acids can also form dimers, which are called dipeptides. An example is glycylglycine, consisting of two glycine molecules joined by a peptide bond.  Other examples include aspartame and carnosine.

Inorganic dimers

Group 13 dimers

Boranes 

Diborane (B2H6) is a classic example of an inorganic dimer. Borane does not exist alone as BH3, even though it is often written in that way. B2H6 exists as a structure where two hydrogen atoms bridge the two boron atoms. The bridging B-H bonds are lower in bond order than what would be expected for a regular B-H bond (they are lower in bond order than the terminal B-H bonds). This is explained by the bond having three centers but only two electrons, "banana bond", instead of the typical single bond with two centers and two electrons.

Aluminium 

Organoaluminium complexes can exist as either monomers or dimers based on the steric bulk of the groups attached. For example, methyl or ethylaluminium exists as a dimer, but when a bulkier group is added, the complex exists as a monomer, such as trimesitylaluminium.

Biochemical dimers

Pyrimidine dimers 
Pyrimidine dimers (also known as thymine dimers) are formed by a photochemical reaction from pyrimidine DNA bases when exposed to ultraviolet light. This cross-linking causes DNA mutations, which can be carcinogenic, causing skin cancers. When pyrimidine dimers are present, they can block polymerases, decreasing DNA functionality until it is repaired.

Protein dimers 

Protein dimers arise from the interaction between two proteins which can interact further to form larger and more complex oligomers. For example, tubulin is formed by the dimerization of α-tubulin and β-tubulin and this dimer can then polymerize further to make microtubules. For symmetric proteins, the larger protein complex can be broken down into smaller identical protein subunits, which then dimerize to decrease the genetic code required to make the functional protein.

G protein-coupled receptors 
As the largest and most diverse family of receptors within the human genome, G protein-coupled receptors (GPCR) have been studied extensively, with recent studies supporting their ability to form dimers. GPCR dimers include both homodimers and heterodimers formed from related members of the GPCR family. While not all, some GPCRs require dimerization to function, such as GABAB-receptor, emphasizing the importance of dimers in biological systems.

Receptor tyrosine kinase 
Much like for G protein-coupled receptors, dimerization is essential for receptor tyrosine kinases (RTK) to perform their function in signal transduction, affecting many different cellular processes. RTKs typically exist as monomers, but undergo a conformational change upon ligand binding, allowing them to dimerize with nearby RTKs. The dimerization activates the cytoplasmic kinase domains that are responsible for further signal transduction.

See also 

Monomer
Trimer
Polymer
Protein dimer
Oligomer

References 

 

Chemical compounds